Ad Pirum was a Roman fortress active during the time of the late Roman Empire. It is located on the Hrušica Plateau in southwestern Slovenia, in the hamlet of Hrušica in Podkraj. It was built in the 320s.

Structure and function

Excavations show the fortress to be of oval shape,  in length,  in width, and with a wall at a height of 6–8 m and a thickness of about 2.7 m; the wall towers were 10 m high. This structure represented a major fort of the Claustra Alpium Iuliarum, a network of forts and walls to securing Roman Italy from eastern invasions, including the road between Roman Italy and Pannonia. It was typically manned with 500 soldiers.

Further reading

References

External links
 Ad Pirum (Hrušica) on DEDI.si
 Audio tour of the fortress by the Slovenian National Museum
 Ad Pirum: surround photography. Burger.si.

Hrušica (plateau)
Roman towns and cities in Slovenia
Roman fortifications in Slovenia